Byrsia aurantiaca is a moth of the family Erebidae. It is found on Malacca, Borneo and Sumatra.

It is a day-flying species.

References

Lithosiini
Moths described in 1886